Marine de Carné is a French diplomat. She served as France's Ambassador to Monaco until novembre 2019.

Early life
Marine de Carné de Trécesson de Coëtlogon comes from the de Carné family. She is related to Louis de Carné (1804-1876), a politician, journalist and historian.

She grew up in Montceau-les-Mines, Saône-et-Loire, France. She graduated from Sciences Po in 1985.

Career
De Carné began her career in the finance industry. She joined the French Ministry of Foreign Affairs in 1987. She served in Brussels from 1989 to 1992, and in New York City from 1997 to 2001. She has served as France's Ambassador to Monaco since September 16, 2016.

References

Living people
People from Montceau-les-Mines
Sciences Po alumni
French women ambassadors
20th-century French diplomats
21st-century French diplomats
Ambassadors of France to Monaco
Year of birth missing (living people)
Commanders of the Order of Saint-Charles
20th-century French women
21st-century French women